Malaya, originally named Ang Pahayagang Malaya (“The Free Newspaper” in Filipino), is a broadsheet newspaper in the Philippines, headquartered at Intramuros, Manila, and owned by People's Independent Media Inc.  The newspaper is known for being one of the publications that fought against the presidency of Ferdinand Marcos.

The newspaper also publishes a business section called the Malaya Business Insight which is placed before the actual Malaya.

History

Under Jose Burgos, Jr. 
The newspaper's name was derived from the Filipino word that means "free".  In 1981, Malaya was founded by Jose Burgos, Jr. as a weekly, and later daily written in the Tagalog language.  It eventually published its content into English in 1983 when President Ferdinand Marcos closed down WE Forum, a sister publication of Malaya.  It continued to fight the administration of Marcos during its last years in power. During the events that lead to Marcos' ouster, Malaya published one million copies daily, a feat never been done before in the history of newspaper publishing in the Philippines.

Under Amado Macasaet 
After the EDSA Revolution, Amado P. Macasaet, veteran journalist and then Business Editor of Malaya, became the new owner of Malaya. Macasaet also owned two tabloids, Abante and Abante Tonite.

References

External links
Malaya Online

English-language newspapers published in the Philippines
Publications established in 1981
National newspapers published in the Philippines
Newspapers published in Metro Manila
Companies based in Manila
Daily newspapers published in the Philippines